Colonel Bridget Christina McEvilly,  (born 1946) is a retired British Army nurse and nursing administrator who served as Director Army Nursing Services and Matron-in-Chief of the Queen Alexandra's Royal Army Nursing Corps (QARANC).

Nursing career
Born in Middlesex, McEvilly was commissioned in Queen Alexandra's Royal Army Nursing Corps (QARANC) in 1977, having previously been a nurse in hospitals in, among other places, Canada, London, and the Falkland Islands.

McEvilly was later a nursing administrator at the Ministry of Defence, and served as Assistant Director Army Nursing Services. She was awarded the Associate of the Royal Red Cross in the 1985 New Year Honours, and appointed a Commander of the Order of the British Empire in the 2002 New Year Honours.

References

External links
QARANC website
BBC notice of CBE award to Colonel Bridget McEvilly

1946 births
Associate Members of the Royal Red Cross
British nursing administrators
British people of Irish descent
Commanders of the Order of the British Empire
Living people
Queen Alexandra's Royal Army Nursing Corps officers